Kumsenga is an administrative Ward within Muhambwe Constituency in Kibondo District of Kigoma Region in Tanzania. 
In 2016 the Tanzania National Bureau of Statistics report there were 14,811 people in the ward, from 22,641 in 2012.

Villages / neighborhoods 
The ward has 3 villages and 30 hamlets.

 Kumsenga
 Bwozi A
 Bwozi B
 Chemchemi
 Kigwe
 Kumsenga
 Liloama
 Linda
 Lotaagpa
 Nyabihuma
 Nyabusaro
 Kibuye
 Gwanze
 Kibuye
 Kumbanga
 Mheshu
 Mikonko
 Mikonko
 Mkike
 Mukoni
 Nyampande
 Songambele
 Kagezi
 Bisako
 Kagezi
 Kigunga
 Maga
 Mikonko
 Mlange
 Ngoshi
 Nzizi
 Rungarunga
 Shuleni

References

Kibondo District
Wards of Kigoma Region
Constituencies of Tanzania